"She'd Rather Be with Me" is a song written by Garry Bonner and Alan Gordon and released by the Turtles in 1967. The song was the follow-up to "Happy Together".

Lyrics and music
Allmusic critic Stewart Mason described "She'd Rather Be with Me" as a "big, brassy pop song" that was "probably the least ironically cheerful single the Turtles ever did."  Mason describes Howard Kaylan's lead vocal as evoking "unfeigned giddiness" and comments on the "huge production" including a full orchestra and prominent cowbell.

Chart performance
The song was a major international hit, and spent 11 weeks on the Billboard Hot 100 chart, peaking at No. 3, while reaching No. 1 on Record Worlds "100 Top Pops", No. 1 on Canada's "RPM 100", No. 1 in South Africa, No. 2 on the Cash Box Top 100, No. 3 in Denmark, and No. 3 on the Irish Singles Chart. The song also spent 15 weeks on the UK's Record Retailer chart, peaking at No. 4, making it The Turtles' biggest hit in the United Kingdom. The song was a major hit in many other nations as well.

Weekly chart

Year-end charts

References

1967 songs
1967 singles
Songs written by Alan Gordon (songwriter)
The Turtles songs
RPM Top Singles number-one singles
Number-one singles in South Africa